Matupi District is a district of the Chin State in Myanmar.

References 

Districts of Myanmar